Bagan Datoh, alternative spelling: Bagan Datok, Bagan Datuk, Bagan Dato' may refer to:
Bagan Datuk
Bagan Datok (federal constituency), represented in the Dewan Rakyat